Majer (Czech and Slovak feminine Majerová) is a surname, Slavic version of German surnames Maier and Mayer. Notable people with the surname include:

Damjan Majer (born 1969), Slovenian archer
Janusz Majer (born 1946), Polish mountain climber
Joseph Friedrich Bernhard Caspar Majer (born 1689), German musician and author
Josef Majer (1925-2013), Czechoslovak footballer
Lovro Majer (born 1998), Croatian footballer
Marie Majerová (1882-1967), Czech writer
Žan Majer (born 1992), Slovenian footballer

Surnames of German origin
Croatian surnames
Czech-language surnames
Polish-language surnames
Slovene-language surnames